Ashley Klose is an Australian composer, musical artist, teacher and sound producer.

Career

Klose's work has appeared in a range of film and television productions.

At the APRA-AGSC Screen Music Awards of 2003 Klose won the trophy for Best Music for an Educational, Training or Corporate Film/Video with his work on South Australian Film Corporation's SAFC: 30th Anniversary presentation. In 2007 he was one of twelve invited participants in the ASCAP Film and Television Scoring Workshop sponsored by American Society of Composers, Authors and Publishers (ASCAP).

Television and film
Lockie Leonard: dialogue editor
Errorism: A Comedy of Terrors (TV Series): sound, sound mixer 
Look Both Ways: dialogue editor, sound effects editor 
Shot of Love: supervising sound editor 
Young Blades: sound 
I Burn (short film): location sound recordist, sound designer, sound mixer
Chuck Finn (TV series): effects editor - 17 episodes

Documentary

The Quiet Room: (sound attachment) 
The Love Market (documentary) 
Sacred Ground (documentary) 
PictoCrime 
Moustache (short) 
Book Em (short) 
Offside (additional music) 
The Old Man Who Read Love Stories (music supervisor) 
The Quiet Room (conductor and music arranger)

References

External links

Living people
Australian film score composers
Male film score composers
Australian music arrangers
Australian audio engineers
Musicians from Adelaide
Year of birth missing (living people)